Joshua Hardin (born January 10, 2005) is an American soccer player who plays as a midfielder for USL Championship side Tacoma Defiance and the Seattle Sounders FC academy.

Career 
Hardin made his professional debut for Tacoma Defiance on September 17, 2020 as a late substitute in a 3-2 loss vs. Reno 1868 FC.

References

External links
 

Association football midfielders
American soccer players
Tacoma Defiance players
USL Championship players
Soccer players from Washington (state)
2005 births
Living people